Virginópolis is a Brazilian municipality in the state of Minas Gerais. As of 2020 its population is estimated to be 10,484. Every year, from the end of October to the beginning of November, the municipality celebrates its Festival of Jabuticaba, a fruit commonly grown in the area.

References

Municipalities in Minas Gerais